Fremover is a regional newspaper published in Narvik, Norway. It has been published for more than 100 years, having been founded on May 27, 1903.

Fremover, which has no party affiliation, is read daily by approx. 29,000 people. Each edition has approx. 30 pages, and the current editor in chief is Roger Bergersen.
Translated into English, its name means "Forward".

External links
Official website

Daily newspapers published in Norway
Publications established in 1903
Amedia
1903 establishments in Norway
Narvik
Mass media in Nordland